The Guild of Specialists trilogy is a series of novels by British children's author Joshua Mowll, published by Walker Books. The series follows the lives of Rebecca and Douglas MacKenzie in their quest to find their parents after they had gone missing on an expedition to the Sinkiang desert in China. They meet up with their uncle, now guardian, Captain Fitzroy MacKenzie and he welcomes them onto his ship, the Expedient. They stumble upon the Guild of Specialists, a secret society of which their uncle is a part, as they embark upon their journey. Slowly, they begin to uncover the secrets of the Guild and begin to wonder what their parents had been looking for in the Sinkiang desert. The final book was published on May 12, 2009.

Novels
Operation Red Jericho (2005)
Operation Typhoon Shore (2006)
Operation Storm City (2009)

External links 
 Official publisher's page on Operation Red Jericho
 Official publisher's page on the author

Young adult novel series
Novels by Joshua Mowll
Walker Books books